Otto Müller or Mueller may refer to:

 Otto Mueller (1874–1930), German painter of the Die Brücke movement
 Otto Müller (painter) (1898–1979), German painter from Halle, Saxony-Anhalt
 Otto Mueller (politician) (1875–1973), American politician in Wisconsin
 Otto Müller (novelist) (1816–1894), German novelist
 Otto Müller (water polo) (1910–?), Austrian Olympic water polo player
 Otto Müller (wrestler) (1899–?), Swiss freestyle wrestler
 Otto Friedrich Müller (1730–1784), Danish naturalist
 Otto Müller (priest) (1870–1944), German priest, member of German Resistance in Nazi Germany
 Otto Thott Fritzner Müller (1864–1944), Norwegian politician
 Otto Müller or Walther Otto Müller (1833–1887), German botanist specializing in cryptogamenae

See also
 Otto-Werner Mueller (1926–2016), German-born conductor
 Otto Muller von Czernicki (1909–1998), field hockey player
 Otto von Müller (1875–1976), German tennis player